Carneades bicincta is a species of beetle in the family Cerambycidae. It was described by Gahan in 1889. It is known from Guadeloupe.

References

Colobotheini
Beetles described in 1889